Luis Alberto Félix Sánchez Sánchez (October 12, 1900 – February 6, 1994) was a Peruvian lawyer, jurist, philosopher, historian, writer and politician. A historic member of the Peruvian Aprista Party, he became a Senator and member of two Constitutional Assemblies, in which the second one (1978–1980), he occupied the Vice-Presidency of the Assembly and the Presidency of the Constitution Committee. During the Presidency of Alan García (1985–1990), he was his Second Vice President and was appointed for a short period as Prime Minister of Peru. In Congress he served as President of the Senate two occasions (1966–1967 and 1985–1986). He is the oldest Vice President of Peru, taking office at the age of 84 years, 289 days.

Biography 
The figure of Luis Alberto Sanchez, who was born at Lima in 1900, covers most of the century. He was three times Provost of the Universidad Nacional Mayor de San Marcos. Together with Raúl Porras Barrenechea and Jorge Guillermo Leguia, he was one of the leading figures of the Conversation University founded in 1919 with the participation, among others, of Víctor Raúl Haya de la Torre, Jorge Basadre, Carlos Paz Soldan Moreyra, Ricardo Garcia and Jose Luis Vegas Llosa Belaunde.

Among his literary works and news articles we have a large amount from Garcilaso Inca de la Vega, first Creole (1939), Aladdin or life and work of Jose Santos Chocano (1960), process and content of the Latin American novel (1968), comparative History of American literature (1973–1976), to Indianism and Indigenism in Peruvian literature (1981).

But his main work and the dearest was dedicated to Manuel González Prada, which took shape with titles like 'Don Manuel' (1930), 'Myth and Reality of Gonzalez Prada' (1976), 'Our lives are the rivers ... History and legend of González Prada' (1977) and a substantial variety of editions of the work of González Prada. As a politician, was a prominent figure of the Peruvian Aprista Party and scored the second most votes, after Victor Raul Haya de la Torre, during the general elections to constitute the Constituent Assembly in 1979. He was elected Second Vice President of Peru in 1985, as the running mate of Alan García. He was also elected re-elected as Senator at the same time.

Last years and death 
At the end of his life, in 1990 he was elected Senator and served until the closing of Congress by the 1992 self-coup of Alberto Fujimori. He died in 1994 in Lima, dedicating his last days to writing.

He taught at the Deutsche Schule Lima Alexander von Humboldt.

References

1900 births
1994 deaths
Politicians from Lima
Vice presidents of Peru
Presidents of the Congress of the Republic of Peru
Peruvian people of Spanish descent
20th-century Peruvian lawyers
Peruvian essayists
Peruvian philosophers
Peruvian translators
20th-century Peruvian historians
Historians of Peru
National University of San Marcos alumni
Academic staff of the National University of San Marcos
English–Spanish translators
French–Spanish translators
German–Spanish translators
American Popular Revolutionary Alliance politicians
Presidents of the Senate of Peru
Prime Ministers of Peru
20th-century philosophers
Knights Grand Cross of the Order of Isabella the Catholic